Bulgaria competed at the World Games 2017 in Wroclaw, Poland, from 20 July 2017 to 30 July 2017.

Competitors

Qualifications for TWG 2017, Wrocław (POL)

Gymnastic

Rhythmic Gymnastics
Bulgaria has qualified at the 2017 World Games:

Women's individual event - 1 quota

References

Nations at the 2017 World Games
2017 in Bulgarian sport
2017